Luis Robert Moirán Jr. (born August 3, 1997) is a Cuban professional baseball outfielder for the Chicago White Sox of Major League Baseball (MLB). He made his MLB debut in 2020.

Professional career

Cuban National Series
Robert played in the Cuban National Series for Ciego de Ávila from 2013 to 2015.

Minor leagues
In November 2016, Robert defected from Cuba to pursue a Major League Baseball (MLB) career in the United States. On April 20, 2017, he was declared a free agent, but he was not eligible to sign with any major league club until May 20.

On May 27, 2017, Robert signed a contract with the Chicago White Sox that included a $26 million signing bonus. After signing, he reported to the DSL White Sox and played 28 games there, posting a .310 batting average with three home runs, 14 RBIs, 22 bases on balls, and 12 stolen bases.

In 2018, Robert made his first start at outfield in a spring training game and hit a two-out, go-ahead grand slam in the eighth inning, lifting the White Sox to a 14–12 victory over the Cincinnati Reds. However, Robert was placed on the injured list for two months after the game, because he had sprained a ligament in his left thumb while sliding into second base. 

Robert began 2019 with the Winston-Salem Dash; he was promoted to the Birmingham Barons on April 30. Robert was named to the 2019 All-Star Futures Game. On July 11, he made his debut with Class AAA Charlotte, where he hit two home runs in his first game with seven runs batted in. Robert joined the 30/30 club by hitting 30 home runs and stealing 36 bases during the 2019 season.

In 2019, he scored 108 runs, the second most in the minor leagues, and he led the minors with 165 hits.

Major league career

Rookie season and Gold Glove Award (2020)
On January 2, 2020, Robert agreed to a six-year, $50 million contract with the Chicago White Sox before appearing in a major league game. The contract includes team options for 2026 and 2027 which, if exercised, could bring the value of the contract to $88 million. On July 24, he made his MLB debut. July 26, he hit his first MLB home run.

In August 2020, Robert batted .298/.356/.660, including seven doubles, nine home runs, 20 runs batted in, and three stolen bases over 26 games. He won the American League (AL) Rookie of the Month Award, his first monthly award in the major leagues.
Overall in 2020, he batted .233/.302/.436 over 202 at-bats. Robert hit his first postseason home run in Game 3 of the Wild Card Series against the Oakland Athletics off of Mike Fiers. His 487-foot home run was the longest postseason home run in White Sox history. He also won the Gold Glove Award for center field, becoming the second White Sox player in history to win the award in his rookie season. Robert also finished 2nd in AL Rookie of the Year voting losing to Kyle Lewis of the Seattle Mariners.

2021
Robert slashed .316/.359/.461 in 25 games through May 2, when he suffered a complete tear of his right hip flexor. The injury required a rehabilitation period of three to four months before he could resume baseball activities. On May 27, he was placed on the 60-day injured list. He was activated off the injured list on August 9. Overall, Robert hit .338 with 13 home runs and 43 RBIs in 68 games in 2021.

2022
On September 24, Robert was placed on the IL with a sprained left wrist which ended his season after getting hit by a pitch against the Seattle Mariners. In 2022, Robert appeared in 98 games with a batting average of .284 hitting 12 home runs and 56 RBIs.

2023
On February 17, 2023, Robert announced that he would utilize the "Jr." suffix in his name from then on, which would also be reflected on his uniform.

International career
Before his defection, Robert represented the Cuban national team in international youth competition, including the 2015 18U Baseball World Cup, where he was named to the all-tournament team. He also played for the national team in June 2016, as part of a goodwill tour of the Can-Am League of independent baseball.

Robert was named to the Cuban national team for 2023 World Baseball Classic. Along with White Sox teammate Yoán Moncada, he became the first active MLB player to be play for Cuba after having defected. Robert said the situation was "a little strange, because there are some [defectors] who sadly cannot play." In the tournament, Robert batted .259/.286/.296, with seven hits and eight strikeouts in 27 at-bats.

See also

 List of baseball players who defected from Cuba
 List of Chicago White Sox award winners and league leaders
 List of Major League Baseball players from Cuba

References

External links

1997 births
Living people
2023 World Baseball Classic players
Arizona League White Sox players
Birmingham Barons players
Charlotte Knights players
Chicago White Sox players
Defecting Cuban baseball players
Dominican Summer League White Sox players
Cuban expatriate baseball players in the Dominican Republic
Glendale Desert Dogs players
Gold Glove Award winners
Kannapolis Intimidators players
Major League Baseball players from Cuba
Cuban expatriate baseball players in the United States
Major League Baseball outfielders
National baseball team players
People from Ciego de Ávila
Tigres de Ciego de Avila players
Winston-Salem Dash players